The women's team table tennis class 6–10 tournament at the 2012 Summer Paralympics in London took place from 5 September to 8 September 2012 at ExCeL Exhibition Centre. Classes 6–10 were for athletes with a physical impairment who competed from a standing position.

Bracket

Results

First round

Quarter-finals

Semifinals

Finals
Gold medal match

Bronze medal match

References

WT06-10
Para